Anderson da Silva de Jesus (born October 27, 1977), known as Neguette,  is a Brazilian central defender  for Al-Khor Sports Club in the Qatari League.

Contract
16/01/3000

External links 

Neguette at Placar

1977 births
Living people
Brazilian footballers
Clube Atlético Mineiro players
Esporte Clube Juventude players
Ituano FC players
Paraná Clube players
Al-Khor SC players
Expatriate footballers in Qatar
Association football defenders
Footballers from Belo Horizonte